The 34th Virginia Infantry Regiment was an infantry regiment raised in Virginia for service in the Confederate States Army during the American Civil War. It fought mostly with the Army of Northern Virginia.

The 34th Virginia was organized in May 1862, with men from Norfolk, Richmond, and Yorktown, and the counties of Gloucester, Mecklenburg, Bedford, Greene, and King and Queen. For almost two years the unit served as heavy artillery attached to the Department of Richmond and was known as the 4th Heavy Artillery.

In May, 1864, it was assigned to Wise's Brigade as infantry. It participated in the long Petersburg siege south of the James River, and saw action in various conflicts around Appomattox.

It contained 466 effectives in June, 1862, and surrendered 14 officers and 210 men.

The field officers were Colonel John T. Goode, Lieutenant Colonel Randolph Harrison, and Major John R. Bagby.

See also

List of Virginia Civil War units

References

Units and formations of the Confederate States Army from Virginia
1864 establishments in Virginia
Military units and formations established in 1864
Artillery units and formations of the American Civil War
1865 disestablishments in Virginia
Military units and formations disestablished in 1865